Phat Girlz is a 2006 American romantic comedy film written and directed by Nnegest Likké and starring Mo'Nique, as well as Kendra C. Johnson, Jimmy Jean-Louis, Godfrey, and Joyful Drake.

Plot

Jazmin Biltmore is a smart-mouthed, plus-sized, aspiring fashion designer and department store employee who is obsessed with her weight. Jazmin has always been overweight, constantly battling with diets, weight loss aids, and even her own clothes. Because of her battle with finding trendy clothes that fit her full figure, despite working in a clothing department store, Jazmin creates and designs her own outfits. Even going as far as attempting to get a business loan to get her clothing line up and running.

During a bout of depression, Jazmin is contacted from one of her diet plan agencies and told she won a trip for 3 to Palm Springs for the weekend at a five-star resort.  She and best friend Stacey find the first day at the spa disappointing, since nothing was plus sized friendly, including the other hotel guests.  They leave in frustration to join Mia, who has been ogling a Nigerian man swimming in the pool. Despite Mia's obvious flirting, he expresses interest in Jazmin. He introduces himself as Dr. Tunde, but Jazmin is tongue tied, too distracted by his good looks. He and his friends find Jazmin and Stacey beautiful. However, they think Mia is too skinny and wonder if she is sick.  They invite the women to a Nigerian party, Tunde, speaking Nigerian with his friends Dr. Akibo and Dr. Godwin, tells them he has never seen such beautiful full figured women in America.

Upon their night out, Tunde expresses even more interest with her outspoken behaviour and strong opinions. Akibo shows his desire for Stacey and she reciprocates, fighting her shy nature. Meanwhile Godwin attempts to flirt with other full figured guests, ignoring Mia. Even going as far as to tell a woman she was a patient, mocking her fit figure. Akibo and Stacey go on to have days packed with vigorous sex and Mia leaves the party early to go back to the hotel and wallow in self pity over not finding an attractive doctor like Stacey and Jazmin.
Jazmin and Tunde begin dating with Jazmin constantly questioning his attraction to her. Going as far as to ask him if he is truly interested in her, she wonders why he hasn't tried to sleep with her. Tunde tells Jazmin he was trying to be respectful but will gladly sleep with her the next day, due to work obligations but before they consummate their relationship she grows jealous and makes a scene when she sees him having dinner with a beautiful, thin woman; instead of having dinner with a colleague like he told her. Tunde reveals the woman was his colleague, but Jazmin, realizing she is too insecure to be comfortable in a relationship with Tunde, breaks up with him and leaves Palm Springs, along with Stacey and Mia.

At home, she is depressed, ignoring phone calls, comforting herself with food and television before having a breakthrough and realizing she is beautiful and worthy of being loved. Bursting with new confidence, Jazmin approaches the head buyer of the Bloomfields where she works and shows him her designs. Impressed he helps develop Jazmin's fashion line "Thick Madame" becomes popular and is launched worldwide.

One year later, she travels to Nigeria to apologize to the man she realizes she loves. A woman opens the door holding a baby.  Jazmin asks if she is Tunde's wife, and the woman agrees. Jazmin has the girls go to the taxi because she did not wish to be rejected with an audience.  She tells Tunde that he has changed her life, and she is sorry she could not accept his love when she had the chance. Explaining she could not accept love from someone when she did not love herself and though she still cares for him she is not a "homewrecker" and will not pursue him. Tunde clarifies that the woman is a maid, he delivered the baby, and the maid doesn't understand English, and that he is still single. He says his prayers have been answered, as he has loved Jazmin all along and they share a passionate kiss. Stacey also reunites with their partner, and they join Tunde's family for dinner.  Mia piles food on her plate, stating that she wants to bulk up so she can find a rich Nigerian doctor as well.  The film ends with Jazmin and Tunde in bed, while Jazmin insists on having the lights on to see every sexy thing on Tunde's body, with the credits ending.

Cast
 Mo'Nique as Jazmin Biltmore
 Raven Goodwin as Young Jazmin Biltmore
 Jimmy Jean-Louis as Dr. Tunde Jonathan
 Godfrey as Akibo
 Kendra C. Johnson as Stacey
 Joyful Drake as Mia
 Dayo Ade as Goodwin
 Felix Pire as Ramón
 Charles Duckworth as Jack
 Jack Noseworthy as Richard "Dick" Eklund
 Eric Roberts as Robert Myer
 Crystal Rivers as Aimee

Production
The food facility used to film the FatAssBurger scene was the Fatburger in Palm Springs, California. It is located near the Palm Springs International Airport.

Box office
Though critically panned, the film is considered to be a financial success because it recouped its $3 million production budget from theatrical and rental revenues, totaling over $18.6 million.

In its opening weekend, the film grossed a total of $3,109,924 in the United States. The film has grossed a total of $7,061,128 in theaters in the United States. It also made $340,762 overseas, thus totaling $7,401,890 in theaters worldwide.

It also made an additional $11,250,000 on DVD and home video rentals in 2006.

Critical reception
The film received mostly negative reviews, with Rotten Tomatoes reporting that out of 47 reviews, 10 were "Fresh" and 37 "Rotten", making for an overall 21% approval rating and the consensus: "Although Phat Girlz has good intentions, it is sloppily made and thin on laughs." The film has a slightly higher score of 36/100 on Metacritic, indicating "generally unfavorable" reviews. The San Francisco Chronicle praised the film, saying "Clumsily directed yet entertainingly written by Oakland native Nnegest Likké, Phat Girlz is like Rocky with cellulite. Or maybe Pretty Woman without all the bony butts. It has a lot of heart and soul, but it's almost never mean-spirited."

Variety magazine's Joe Leydon said that the film "feels torturously padded at an overlong 98 minutes", and also claims that the romance between Jazmin (Mo'Nique) and Tunde (Jean-Louis) is too drawn out, "quite possibly because writer-director Nnegest Likke has nothing else in her scenario to sustain audience interest". Entertainment Weekly gave the film a D grade, remarking that "Mo'Nique is fat. Almost every scene in Phat Girlz — the fancy z is for Z-grade — is about how she's fat", and concluding that "the movie reduces her to a single discernible characteristic, which is a telltale mark of many a wholly awful comedy."

References

External links
 
 
 
 
 

2006 films
2006 romantic comedy films
American romantic comedy films
Body image in popular culture
Films set in California
Films shot in Los Angeles
2000s English-language films
2000s American films